Poly-γ-glutamate is a metabolite of Bacillus subtilis. Poly-γ-glutamate inhibits tyrosinase and melanogenesis in vitro.

References

Organic polymers